Alien Huddle is an album by a free improvisation trio consisting of Danish saxophonist Lotte Anker, Swiss pianist Sylvie Courvoisier and Japanese electronic artist Ikue Mori, which was recorded in 2006 and released by Intakt Records. It takes its title from a large wooden sculpture by Martin Puryear. The eleven improvisations are inspired by bird songs. Courvoisier and Mori collaborated in two projects previously: Courvoisier's Lonelyville and the improvising trio Mephista with Susie Ibarra.

Reception 
In a review for All About Jazz, Ted Gordon states "The most interesting creation of this particular group, besides the very clear gestures of emotion and communication, is that its roles switch constantly: in this album's textural huddle, it's the collective output that trumps the individual's contribution."

The Point of Departure review by Stuart Broomer notes that "While the trio of Anker’s saxophones, Courvoisier’s often prepared piano and Mori’s electronics might seem unusual, the three immediately adapt certain practices that can suggest it’s the most normal grouping in the world."

Track listing 
All compositions by Anker/Courvoisier/Mori
 "Morning Dove" – 4:17
 "Woodpecker Peeks" – 3:58
 "Sparkling Sparrows" – 5:09
 "Night Owl" – 5:31
 "Robins Quarrel" – 3:45
 "Dancing Rooster Comp" – 4:51
 "Whistling Swan" – 4:09
 "Crow and Raven" – 1:58
 "Blackbird" – 5:15
 "Ostrich War" – 3:50
 "Great White Heron" – 4:15

Personnel 
Lotte Anker – soprano sax, alto sax, tenor sax
Sylvie Courvoisier – piano
Ikue Mori – electronics

References 

2008 albums
Lotte Anker albums
Intakt Records albums
Sylvie Courvoisier albums